Curubis tetrica, is a species of spider of the genus Curubis. It is found in Sri Lanka and India.

References

Salticidae
Spiders of Asia
Spiders described in 1902